The National Border Patrol Council (NBPC) is a labor union established in 1967 that represents agents and support staff on the United States Border Patrol. It is an affiliate of the American Federation of Government Employees, and through that larger organization is a member of the AFL–CIO.

History
During the 2016 presidential election, the group made its first presidential endorsement in October 2016 for Republican nominee Donald Trump, who later was elected the 45th President of the United States. The NBPC again supported Donald Trump during his re-election campaign in 2020.

References

External links
 
 National Border Patrol Council footage on C-SPAN

Trade unions in the United States
Trade unions established in 1967
United States Border Patrol
1967 establishments in the United States